Pterostylis vitrea, commonly known as the glassy leafy greenhood, is a plant in the orchid family Orchidaceae and is endemic to Queensland. Non-flowering plants have a rosette of leaves on a short stalk. Flowering plants lack a rosette but have up to seven translucent green flowers with darker green lines on a flowering stem with between five and seven stem leaves.

Description
Pterostylis vitrea is a terrestrial, perennial, deciduous herb with an underground tuber. The dorsal sepal and petals are joined to form a hood over the column with the dorsal sepal having a brown tip. It flowers from April to July.

Taxonomy and naming
The glassy leafy greenhood was first formally described in 2006 by David Jones who gave it the name Bunochilus vitreus and published the description in Australian Orchid Research from a specimen collected near Maleny. In 2008, Peter Bostock changed the name to Pterostylis vitrea. The specific epithet (vitrea) is a Latin word meaning "glassy", referring to the glassy appearance of the flowers.

Distribution and habitat
Pterostylis vitrea grows in wet forest and on rainforest margins, sometimes near rocky cliffs between the Kenilworth and the McPherson Range.

References

vitrea
Orchids of Queensland
Plants described in 2006